Chicken & Biscuits is the second studio album by American country rap artist Colt Ford. It was released on April 20, 2010 via Average Joe's Entertainment. The album features the single "Chicken & Biscuits" in two versions: one with James Otto, and the other, a radio edit featuring Rhean Boyer of Carolina Rain.

The album has sold 93,613 copies in the U.S. as of August 18, 2010.

Critical reception
Matt Bjorke of Roughstock gave the album four stars out of five, with his review saying that "Ford has tapped into something unique and that is the exact reason why he’s sold as many albums he has the past couple of years." The album received a three-star rating from Country Weekly reviewer Jessica Phillips, who praised Ford's "guttural voice and well-rendered rhymes" and considered Ford's musical image more country-oriented than that of Cowboy Troy, but called "Tool Timer" and "All About Y'all" "disposable." Paul Brian of Engine 145 gave the title track a thumbs-up, saying that its lyrics were cliché but that it "its infectious energy grows on you."

Track listing

Chart performance

Weekly charts

Year-end charts

Singles

References

2010 albums
Colt Ford albums
Average Joes Entertainment albums